The Tri-Nations is an annual football tournament competed for by the Under 16 level teams of Northern Ireland, Republic of Ireland and Wales.

Unlike most international tournaments, each entering Football Association will submit two teams - an 'A' and a 'B' team. The overall winner is determined by the sum of the combined results of both entered teams.

Previous winners

2009 - Wales

References

International association football competitions in Europe
Youth association football competitions for international teams